Jules Louis Lewal (13 December 1823 – 22 January 1908) was a French general, who also wrote scripts like Stratégie de combat (translation: Combat strategy).

Biography
He was born in Paris; entered the army in 1846; served in the Italian campaign of 1859, with the French troops in Mexico (1862), and, after cooperation with Adolphe Niel in the army reforms, in the Franco-Prussian War. He was promoted to brigadier general in 1874; became head of the Military Academy three years after; in 1885 was Minister of War in Ferry's Cabinet; and in 1888 was appointed inspector general.

Writings
 La réforme de l'armée (1871)
 Études de guerre (1872 and 1890)
 Tactique (1875–83)
 Stratégie de marche (1893)
 Stratégie de combat (1895 sqq.)

Notes

References
 

1823 births
1908 deaths
Politicians from Paris
French generals
French Ministers of War
Politicians of the French Third Republic